"Perfect" is a song by Australian recording artist Vanessa Amorosi. "Perfect" was released in April 2008 as the second single from Amorosi's third studio album, Somewhere in the Real World.

Amorosi co-wrote "Perfect" with Australian songwriter David Franj and they each brought a different perspective to the theme of love, resulting in a powerful tune. "He was in love with his girlfriend, so his take on it was she's perfect, everything about her is so magnificent. And I'm the other side of love where I'm like that's obsessive and there's hard work in love and what you see as perfect is not necessarily going to be perfect in 20 years time."

Amorosi says "Perfect" is "really a love story by two totally different people. That's my interpretation of it. I mean, it's open to anyone's interpretation but for me love is ... I find it to be quite obsessive. I love the imperfections in a person more so than the perfect things about them. Love can come in different shapes and forms and that's what it's really going on about."

"Perfect" was the most played song by an Australian artist on the 2008 National Airplay Chart (The Music Network – 22 December 2008). The track also hit number one on the Australian iTunes Store on 6 June 2008.

Before release as a single, "Perfect" was featured in promotions by the Seven Network for the American show Bionic Woman. It will also be used in a commercial campaign for jeans by Calvin Klein in Australia.

Music video
The music video was shot entirely on green screen by noted video producer Stuart Gosling (Westlife, Girls Aloud). It features a glamorous Amorosi walking through a desert setting while peeling back the layers of her get-up. "The idea with this video clip was that beauty comes in all different forms and you can be over-accessorised and look gorgeous and beautiful but you can look just as beautiful stripping all that away", she said.

Awards and nominations

Track listings 
CD single/digital EP
 "Perfect" — 04:49
 "Perfect" (Radio version) — 03:20
 "Perfect" (Soulful version) — 06:09
 "Perfect" (Instrumental) — 04:52

iTunes single
 "Perfect" — 04:49
 "(You Make Me Feel Like) A Natural Woman" (Live from Bluesfest 2007) — 05:17

Charts

Weekly chart

Year-end charts

Certifications

Release history

References 

Vanessa Amorosi songs
2008 singles
2008 songs
Songs written by Vanessa Amorosi
Universal Music Group singles
Music videos directed by Stuart Gosling